Arthur Marslin was a New Zealand rugby union team coach from 1953 to 1954.

Career 
Marslin coached the New Zealand rugby union team from 1953 to 1954 for a total of 5 tests.

References 

New Zealand national rugby union team coaches
New Zealand rugby union coaches